Danny Dunn and the Voice from Space is the tenth novel in the Danny Dunn series of juvenile science fiction/adventure books written by Raymond Abrashkin and Jay Williams. The book was first published in 1967.

Plot introduction 
Professor Bullfinch has created a radio telescope ("dish") for the government which will try to determine if extraterrestrials are trying to contact Earth. When Danny sneaks into the observatory, he hears non-random sounds coming from space. He then must figure out how to translate the sounds.

The observatory described in the book is similar to the real life SETI project, which Carl Sagan would also use later in his novel Contact.

Editions 
McGraw-Hill
 Paperback, 1967, illustrated by Leo R. Summers
 Hardback, 1967, illustrated by Leo R. Summers

MacDonald and Jane's
 Hardback, 1969, illustrated by Anne Mieke

Archway Books
 Paperback, 1979, #12 in their series

Pocket Books
 Paperback, 1983 reissue, illustrated by Leo R. Summers

External links
 

Danny Dunn
1967 American novels
1967 children's books
1967 science fiction novels